This is a list page of all Historic Districts that the County Board of Arlington County, Virginia, has designated as of March 8, 2018. The term “historic district” includes both individual and collections of historic buildings, sites or objects.

Cemeteries
 Ball-Carlin Cemetery (1785)
 Ball Family Burial Grounds (1814)
 Robert Ball Sr. Family Burial Ground (1854)
 Calloway Cemetery (1891) 
 Travers Family Graveyard (1830) 
 Walker Chapel and Cemetery (1871)

Commercial buildings
 Green Valley Pharmacy  (1942)
 Dan Kain Building  (1946)

Community buildings
 Barcroft Community House  (1907)
 Carlin Community Hall  (1892)
 Clarendon Citizens Hall  (1921)

Forts
 Fort C.F. Smith (1863)
 Fort Ethan Allen (1861) 
 Fort Ethan Allen Trench  (1861)

Garden Apartment Complexes
 Colonial Village (1934)
 Buckingham Villages (1937-1953)
 Cambridge Courts (1943)

Houses
 Alcova (1860)
 Ball–Sellers House (1760)
 Broadview (1881)
 George Crossman House (1892)
 Dawson Bailey House (1856) 
 Eastman-Fenwick House (1876)
 Fraber House (1913)
 Glebe House (1854-1857)
 Glenmore (1910)
 Harry Gray House (1881)
 The Hermitage (1931)
 Reevesland (ca. 1900)
 Washington/Torreyson Farm House (ca. 1879)

Industrial structures
 Benjamin Elliott's Coal Trestle

Institutional Buildings
 Arlington Post Office (1937)
 Cherrydale Volunteer Fire House (1919)

Natural elements
 Brandymore Castle (rock formation)

Neighborhoods
 Maywood Neighborhood Historic District (1909)

Places of Worship
 Lomax African Methodist Episcopal (AME) Zion Church (1922)

Schools
 Clarendon (Maury) School (1910)
 Hume School (1891)
 Stratford School (1950)
 Swanson Middle School (1939)

References

Arlington County Historic Districts